Žeravica is a Serbo-Croatian surname, meaning "ember" or "live coal". It may refer to:

Miloš Žeravica (born 1988), Serbian footballer
Ranko Žeravica (born 1929), retired Serbian basketball coach
Miro Žeravica (born 1972), retired Croatian swimmer
Grujica Žeravica (fl. 1665–69), hajduk

See also
Žeravica, place name
Žerevice, place name

Serbian surnames
Croatian surnames